Dondaparthy is a mixed residential zone and commercial area in central Visakhapatnam. It is an important neighborhood in Visakhapatnam.

Accessibility
 Dondaparthy is located close to the famous locality of Dwaraka Nagar.
 Dondaparthy is situated towards the south of the Visakhapatnam city center. The distance between Dondaparthi and city center is a little more than 1.8 km.
 Visakhapatnam Railway Station, the premium railway station in Vizag, is less than 1 km from Dondaparthi.
 Dondaparthi is surrounded by Railway New Colony Road, Thatichetlapalem Road, Akkayyapalem Road and Railway Station Road.
 Telugu Talli Flyover is connecting from Asilmetta to Dondaparthi is 1.8 km.

Transportation
Dondaparthy is well connected to Gajuwaka, Gopalapatnam, NAD X Road, Arilova and Maddilapalem

APSRTC routes

References

Neighbourhoods in Visakhapatnam